Garza is a Galician and Basque surname and the Spanish word for the heron. Garza has also become a part of many placenames.

Garza was the surname of many Sephardi Jews that settled in Monterrey, Nuevo León, Mexico and the name is still found in many famous people from that Mexican state. Other Garzas settled in the neighboring states of Coahuila in Mexico and Texas in the United States.

From Nuevo León

Governors of Nuevo León 
 Blas María de la Garza Falcón (1712-1767) – Governor of Nuevo León
 Lázaro Garza Ayala – Governor of Nuevo León (1869)

Other people 
 Aarón Sáenz Garza – a politician
 Eugenio Garza Lagüera (1923-2008) – multi-millionaire former owner of the world's second largest Coca-Cola bottler (FEMSA)
 Eugenio Garza Sada (1892-1973) – a multi-millionaire and philanthropist, father of Garza Lagüera and founder of the ITESM
 Mauricio Fernández Garza – a politician, former mayor of San Pedro Garza García, currently a PAN candidate for that same office
 Manuel Uribe, One of the heaviest people
 A. J. DeLaGarza - a Guamanian international footballer
 A family of professional wrestlers:
 Ángel Humberto Garza Solano (born 1992) – known in the US as Angel Garza (without the acute accent)
 Héctor Garza (1969–2013) – ring name of Héctor Solano Segura; uncle of Angel Garza and Humberto Carrillo
 Humberto Garza Carrillo (born 1995) – known as Humberto Carrillo

From Coahuila 
 Aarón Sáenz Garza – a politician
 José María Garza Gallán – a politician, former governor of Coahuila
 Mariana Garza – an actress, sister of Jaime
 Roque González Garza - former Mexican president
 Venustiano Carranza de la Garza – President of MexicoFrom Texas

 Jose Antonio de la Garza - (1776-1851?), mayor of San Antonio, Texas (1813 and 1832), the first landowner in San Antonio and the first man to create a coin in this state
 John Garza (born 1955), member of the Texas House of Representatives, R-San Antonio
 Ed Garza – former mayor of San Antonio, Texas
 Cayetano Garza – an American comic designer and illustrator
 Emilio M. Garza – an American judge on the United States Court of Appeals for the Fifth Circuit
 Henry Garza – Guitarist and vocalist in Los Lonely Boys
 Jojo Garza – Bass player and vocalist in Los Lonely Boys
 José Garza – Lawyer in Austin Texas
 Ringo Garza – Drummer and vocalist in Los Lonely Boys
 Daniel "Dani Doom" Garza - vocalist of the band Design the Skyline
 Juan Raul Garza – an American murderer, executed under the death penalty in 2001
 Tony Garza – a Mexican American politician, current ambassador of the United States to Mexico and husband of María Asunción Aramburuzabala, the richest woman in Mexico
 Reynaldo G. Garza – the first Mexican American federal judge in the United States

Others
 Alicia Garza, American civil rights activist known for co-founding Black Lives Matter
 Ale Garza, American comic artist
 Alex Garza (born 1994), American politician
 Daniel Garza, Mexican tennis player
 Jaime Garza (actor) (1954–2021), Mexican actor
 Jaime Garza (boxer) (born 1959), Mexican American boxer
 Luka Garza (born 1998), American basketball player
 Matt Garza (born 1983), American baseball player
 Pablo Garza (fighter), American lightweight mixed martial arts fighter
 Ralph Garza Jr. (born 1994), American baseball player

See also
Garza (disambiguation)

Spanish-language surnames